, born 26 October 2001, is a Japanese professional Go player at Nihon Ki-in since 2016.

Achievements

References 

2001 births
Living people
Japanese Go players
Female Go players
Sportspeople from Tokyo